A Place without Parents is a 1974 American film. It was also known as Pigeon.

See also
 List of American films of 1974

External links

1974 films
1974 comedy-drama films
American comedy-drama films
Dimension Pictures films
1970s English-language films
1970s American films